Slinge is an above-ground subway station in the south of the city of Rotterdam. It is part of Rotterdam Metro lines D and E. Slinge is the southern terminus of line E, while line D trains continue towards De Akkers station.

The station opened on 25 November 1970 as part of a one-station extension of the North-South Line (also formerly called Erasmus line). It has two platforms and three running tracks; the inner track is only used by trains terminating at Slinge, while the other trains use the outer two tracks.

Rotterdam Metro stations
RandstadRail stations in Rotterdam
Railway stations opened in 1970
1970 establishments in the Netherlands
Railway stations in the Netherlands opened in the 20th century